Caroline Lawrence (born 1954) is an English American author, best known for The Roman Mysteries series of historical novels for children. The series is about a Roman girl called Flavia and her three friends: Nubia (a freed slave girl), Jonathan (a shunned Jewish boy) and Lupus (a beggar boy without a tongue). The series has won numerous awards and has been published in many different languages worldwide. In March 2010, Lawrence was commissioned to write another history mystery series of books called The Western Mysteries, set in Virginia City, Nevada Territory in the early 1860s.

Biography 

Lawrence was born in London, England. Her American parents returned to the United States shortly afterwards and she grew up in Bakersfield, California with her younger brother and sister. Her father taught English and drama in a local high school and her mother was an artist.

When she was twelve, Caroline's family moved to Stanford University in northern California so that her father could study Linguistics. She afterwards studied Classics at Berkeley, where she won a Marshall Scholarship to Cambridge. There, at Newnham College, she studied Classical Art and Archaeology.

After Cambridge, Caroline remained in England, and later took an MA in Hebrew and Jewish Studies at University College London. She then taught Latin, French and art at a small London primary school. In 2000 she wrote The Thieves of Ostia, the first in a series of children's adventure stories set in Ancient Rome, the book was published in 2001. The Roman Mysteries combine Caroline's love of art history, ancient languages and travel. Her other passions include cinema, jazz and London. Caroline has a son Simon, from a previous marriage, and she now lives by the Thames in London with her husband Richard, a graphic designer. In 2009, Caroline won the Classical Association Prize of £5000 for "a significant contribution to the public understanding of Classics".

Lawrence has also worked on the University of Reading's educational website Romans Revealed, creating stories about Roman Britain closely based on archaeological finds.

In 2013 she was chosen to be President of JACT (The Joint Association of Classical Teachers) following in the footsteps of Boris Johnson, Bettany Hughes and Paul Cartledge.

Bibliography

The Roman Mysteries series 

 The Thieves of Ostia (2001)
 The Secrets of Vesuvius (2001)
 The Pirates of Pompeii (2002)
 The Assassins of Rome (2002)
 The Dolphins of Laurentum (2003)
 The Twelve Tasks of Flavia Gemina (2003)
 The Enemies of Jupiter (2003)
 The Gladiators from Capua (2004)
 The Colossus of Rhodes (2005)
 The Fugitive from Corinth (2005)
 The Sirens of Surrentum (2006)
 The Charioteer of Delphi (2006)
 The Slave-girl from Jerusalem (2007)
 The Beggar of Volubilis (2007)
 The Scribes from Alexandria (2008)
 The Prophet from Ephesus (2009)
 The Man from Pomegranate Street (2009)

Roman Mystery Scrolls 

 The Sewer Demon (2012)
 The Poisoned Honey Cake (2012)
 The Thunder Omen  (2013)
 The Two-Faced God (2013)

Roman Quests 
Escape from Rome (2016)
The Archers of Isca (2016)
Death in the Arena (2017)
Return to Rome (2018)

The Time Travel Diaries 
Adventure in Athens (2020) 

Short stories

 The Code of Romulus (World Book day promotion) (2007)
 Trimalchio's Feast and other mini-mysteries (2007)
 The Legionary from Londinium and other mini-mysteries (2010)

Associated non-fiction books include:

 The First Roman Mysteries Quiz Book (2007)
 The Roman Mysteries Treasury (2007)
 From Ostia to Alexandria with Flavia Gemina (2009)

Western Mysteries/P.K. Pinkerton Mysteries 

 The Case of the Deadly Desperados (2011)
 The Case of the Good-Looking Corpse (2012) US title "  P.K. Pinkerton and the Petrified Man  "
 The Case of the Pistol-Packing Widows (2013)
 The Case of the Bogus Detective (2015)

References

External links 
 The Roman Mysteries homepage
 Interview with Caroline Lawrence on the Coffee & Circuses podcast

Living people
English children's writers
English historical novelists
Writers of historical fiction set in antiquity
Writers of historical mysteries
Alumni of Newnham College, Cambridge
Writers from London
1954 births